Kosmos 213 ( meaning Cosmos 213) was one of a series of Soviet Soyuz programme test spacecraft whose purpose was to further test and develop the passenger version. Scientific data and measurements were relayed to earth by multichannel telemetry systems equipped with space-borne memory units. Kosmos 212 and Kosmos 213 automatically docked in orbit on April 15, 1968. Both spacecraft landed on Soviet territory.

Mission
On 15 April 1968 at 09:34:18 GMT, the Soyuz 11A511 s/n U15000-06 booster and Kosmos 213 were set up at Site 1/5 of Baikonur Cosmodrome and the planned mission could be carried out.

References

Soyuz uncrewed test flights
Kosmos satellites
1968 in the Soviet Union
Spacecraft launched in 1968